A defense pact (or defence pactCommonwealth spelling) is a type of treaty or military alliancewhich the signatories promise to support each other militarily and to defend each other.general, the signatories point out the threatsthe treaty and concretely prepare to respond to it together.

Current treaties

Historical treaties

Russia
 1881: League of the Three Emperors – between the German Empire, Austria-Hungary, and the Russian Empire
 1955: Warsaw Pact – between Albania, Bulgaria, Czechoslovakia, East Germany, Hungary, Poland, Romania, and the Soviet Union

United Kingdom
 1955: Middle East Treaty Organization – between Iran, Iraq, Pakistan, Turkey, and the United Kingdom

United States
 1778: Treaty of Alliance – between the Kingdom of France and the United States
 1954–1977: Southeast Asia Treaty Organization – between Australia, France, New Zealand, the Philippines, Thailand, Pakistan, the United Kingdom, and the United States
 1955: Sino-American Mutual Defense Treaty – between China and the United States

References

Defense
Military alliances
Treaties by type